{{DISPLAYTITLE:C27H40O3}}
The molecular formula C27H40O3 (molar mass: 412.60 g/mol) may refer to:

 Calcipotriol
 Nandrolone cyclohexylpropionate
 Testosterone cypionate